This is a list of snacks common in South India.

 Achappam
 Avalose unda
 Bajji
 Bonda
 Dahi Vada
 Dosa
 Jhangri
 Kozhalappam
 Murukku
 Pakkavada
 Pesarattu
 Poori
 Punugulu
 Vada
 Upma
 Uttapam
 Vattayappam

See also
 List of snack foods from the Indian subcontinent

References

 
 
Snacks, South India